Roodeplaat (Dam Provincial) Nature Reserve is located on the shores of the Roodeplaat Dam, 22 km north-east of Pretoria, Gauteng.

In 1972 the Department of Water Affairs and Forestry (DWAF) delegated the management of the Roodeplaat Dam area to the Nature Conservation division of the Transvaal Provincial Administration (TPA). Their mandate was to develop the area as a nature reserve and outdoor recreation facility for Pretoria's residents. The reserve was proclaimed in 1977.

Roodeplaat dam is a well-known destination for bird watching, game viewing and a range of water sports including freshwater angling.

Over 250 bird species have been recorded here including some interesting species such as Osprey, Eurasian Reed-Warbler, Purple Heron, Black heron and Hammerkop.

See also
 Protected areas of South Africa

Notes

External links

 Roodeplaat Dam Nature Reserve - Ecological Management Plan, August 2007, Gauteng Department of Agriculture, Conservation, Environment and Land Affairs
 Unofficial Guide to the Reserve
 Roodeplaat info at Southern African Birding

Nature reserves in South Africa
Gauteng Parks